The Dr. Charles Fox Brown House is a historic house at 420 Drennan Street in Van Buren, Arkansas.  It is a single story brick structure, whose main block is five bays wide, with a small secondary block set back from the front at the left, and an ell extending to the rear.  It has a side-gable roof, with a front-facing gable above the centered entrance, which is further sheltered by a flat-roof portico supported by four columns.  The eaves are studded with brackets, and there are a pair of round-arch windows in the front-facing gable.  The house was built in 1867 for Dr. Charles Fox Brown, and is unusual for the original 19th-century surgery, located in the secondary block.  The house is stylistically a distinctive blend of Greek Revival and Italianate styles.

The house was listed on the National Register of Historic Places in 1978.

See also
National Register of Historic Places listings in Crawford County, Arkansas

References

Houses on the National Register of Historic Places in Arkansas
Greek Revival houses in Arkansas
Victorian architecture in Arkansas
Houses completed in 1867
Houses in Crawford County, Arkansas
National Register of Historic Places in Crawford County, Arkansas
Buildings and structures in Van Buren, Arkansas